Jackson College was a college affiliated with the Presbyterian Church, located in Columbia, Tennessee.

History
Jackson College was founded as the Manual Labor Academy at Spring Hill, Tennessee, in 1830. Its original enrollment was seven students. As part of the curriculum each student was required to work two hours per day at a manual task. It was thought that this manual labor was beneficial to the student. While at some schools students engaged in mechanical tasks, the Academy was not able to build shops or buy the tools necessary. The students, therefore, engaged in farming.

Some time around 1832, through an act of the legislature, the academy became Jackson College. During this time, the manual labor aspect of the academy was maintained. In 1837 the College moved to Columbia. At this point, the manual labor aspect of the curriculum that began with the original academy was abolished. During the American Civil War the college was burned, along with much of Columbia, by the Union Army. It is likely that it was at this time that the college ceased to exist, but the references available are not clear.

Notable alumni

Notes

References
Merriam, L. S. (1893). Higher education in Tennessee. Washington: Govt. Print. Off. OCLC: 2980902. Retrieved 2009-01-29.
Van Tramp, J.C. (1867). Prairie and Rocky Mountain Adventures: Or, Life in the West. To which is Added a View of the States and Territorial Regions of Our Western Empire: Embracing History, Statistics and Geography, and Descriptions of the Chief Cities of the West. Columbus, OH: Stegner & Condit. Retrieved 2009-01-29.
Wade, R. L., ed. (1846). The Illustrated Family Magazine, Vols. III and IV. Boston: Bradbury, Soden and Co. OCLC: 10803328. Retrieved 2009-01-29.
Woodbridge W. C., ed. (1834). American Annals of Education and Instruction. Boston: William D. Ticknor. OCLC: 48505518. Retrieved 2009-01-29.

External links

 Ancestry.com: MAURY COUNTY TENNESSEE, JACKSON COLLEGE HISTORY

Defunct private universities and colleges in Tennessee
Education in Maury County, Tennessee
Educational institutions established in 1829
Educational institutions disestablished in 1863
American manual labor schools